"Diamonds On the Inside" is a song by American artist Ben Harper. It was released in April 2003 as the second single from his album, Diamonds On the Inside.

Track list
 "Diamonds On the Inside"  (Radio Edit) - 3:45
 "Diamonds On the Inside"  (LP Version) - 4:27

Charts

Pop culture references 
The verse "A candle throws its light into the darkness In a nasty world so shines a good deed" demonstrates the importance of Shakespeare in Harper's references; it comes from the famous play The Merchant of Venice: "How far that little candle throws his beams! So shines a good deed in a naughty world."

References

2003 singles
Ben Harper songs
2003 songs
Virgin Records singles
Songs written by Ben Harper